Antonio Colinas Lobato is a Spanish writer (poet, novelist, journalist, translator, essayist) and intellectual who was born in La Bañeza, León, Spain on January 30, 1946.  He has published a variety of works, but is considered to be above all a poet.  He won Spain's National Prize for Literature in 1982, among several other honors and awards.

Prizes and Honors 

1976 - Premio de la Crítica de poesía castellana for Sepulcro en Tarquinia
1982 - Premio Nacional de Literatura (National Prize for Literature (Spain)) for the anthology Poesía, 1967-1980
1996 - Mención Especial del Premio Internacional Jovellanos de Ensayo for Sobre la Vida Nueva
1998 - Premio Castilla y León de las Letras
1999 - Premio Internacional Carlo Betocchi for his work as a translator and scholar of Italian literature
2001 - Premio de la Academia Castellana y Leonesa de Poesía
2005 - Premio Nacional de Traducción, given by the Ministerio de Asuntos Exteriores de Italia, for his translation of the complete poetry of Nobel-Prize winner Quasimodo
2006 - "Alubia de Oro", award giving him the title of "Personaje Bañezano del Año 2006", created by the weekly publication El Adelanto Bañezano
2006 - Premio Leonés del Año 2006 (given by Cadena Ser)
2008 - Pregonero Vitalicio de la Feria del Libro de Salamanca
2011 - Hijo Adoptivo de Salamanca
2012 - X Premio de la Crítica de Castilla y León
2014 - XV Premio de las Letras Teresa de Ávila
2016 - XXV Premio Reina Sofía de Poesía Iberoamericana
2019 - IX Premio Dante Alighieri
2019 - Premio LericiPea “alla Carriera” 2019 ad Antonio Colinas

Individual Books of Poetry 

Junto al lago. Salamanca: Cuadernos para Lisa, 2001. (Written in 1967)
Poemas de la tierra y de la sangre. León: Diputación Provincial, 1969.
Preludios a una noche total. Madrid: Rialp, col. Adonais, 1969.
Truenos y flautas en un templo. San Sebastián: C.A.G. de Guipúzcoa, 1972.
Sepulcro en Tarquinia. León: Diputación Provincial, col. Provincia, 1975. *2nd edition: Sepulcro en Tarquinia. Barcelona, Lumen, Col. El Bardo, 1976. *3rd edition: Sepulcro en Tarquinia (poema w/ 6 drawings by Montserrat Ramoneda). Barcelona: Galería Amagatotis, 1982. *4th edition: Sepulcro en Tarquinia, poem w/ prologue by Juan Manuel Rozas. Segovia: Pavesas, 1994. *5th edition: Sepulcro en Tarquinia (poem with illustrations by Ramón Pérez Carrió). Pedreguer (Alicante): Collection “Font de La Cometa”, 1999. *6th edition: Sepulcro en Tarquinia (commemoration of the first edition (1975-2005) w/ CD of the poet's voice).  Madrid: Visor Libros, 2005. *7th edition: Sepulcro en Tarquinia (poem, illuminated by the artist Javier Alcaíns). Mérida: Editora Regional de Extremadura, 2009.
Astrolabio. Madrid: Visor Libros, 1979.
En lo oscuro. Rota (Cádiz): Cuadernos de Cera, 1981.
Noche más allá de la noche. Madrid: Visor Libros, 1983. *2nd edition: Noche más allá de la noche. Valladolid: Fundación Jorge Guillén, 2004.
La viña salvaje. Córdoba: Antorcha de Paja, 1985.
Diapasón infinito (w/ illustrations by Perejaume). Barcelona: Tallers Chardon y Yamamoto, 1986.
Dieciocho poemas. Ibiza: Caixa Balears, 1987.
Material de lectura. México: Universidad Nacional Autónoma de México, 1987.
Jardín de Orfeo. Madrid: Visor Libros, 1988.
Libro de las noches abiertas (w/ 16 illustrations by Mario Arlati). Milan: Peter Pfeiffer, 1989.
Blanco / Negro (con 5 ilustraciones de Mario Arlati, ed. bilingüe). Milan: Peter Pfeiffer, 1990.
Los silencios de fuego. Barcelona: Tusquets, col. Marginales, 1992.
La hora interior. Barcelona: Taller Joan Roma, 1992.
Pájaros en el muro / Birds in the wall (bilingual, w/ 3 illustrations by Barry Flanagan). Barcelona: Taller Joan Roma, 1995.
Libro de la mansedumbre. Barcelona, Tusquets, col. Nuevos Textos Sagrados, 1997.
Córdoba adolescente. Córdoba: CajaSur, col. Los Cuadernos de Sandua, 1997.
Amor que enciende más amor. Barcelona: Plaza y Janés, 1999.
Nueve poemas. Salamanca: Celya, col. Aedo de Poesía, 2000.
Tiempo y abismo. Barcelona: Tusquets, col. Nuevos Textos Sagrados, 2002.
L'amour, el amor (w/ poems by Michel Bohbot; illustrations by Irriguible). Paris: Editions du Labyrinthe, 2002.
Obscur hautbois de brume (bilingual anthology by Françoise, et al. Contains Noche más allá de la noche). Bruxelles: Le Cri, 2003.
Seis poemas (commentary by Luis Miguel Alonso). Burgos: Instituto de la Lengua de Castilla y León, 2003.
Treinta y ocho poemas (tribute to Antonio Manso). Madrid: Real Casa de la Moneda, 2003.
En Ávila unas pocas palabras. Valladolid: El Gato Gris, 2004.
Respirar adentro (w/ photos by Gianfranco Negri-Clementi). Milan: Scheiwiller, 2006.
Trilogía de la mansedumbre (edition not sold). Valladolid: Junta de Castilla y León, 2006.
Donde la luz llora luz. Valladolid: El Gato Gris, 2007.
Riberas del Órbigo (w/ photos by Manuel Raigada). La Bañeza (León): Ayuntamiento de La Bañeza, 2007.
Desiertos de la luz. Barcelona: Tusquets, 2008.
Catorce retratos de mujer. Salamanca: El Zurguén, 2011. *2nd edition: Catorce retratos de mujer. Cuenca: Segundo Santos Ediciones, 2011.  *3rd edition: Catorce retratos de mujer (w/ 14 illustrations by Cis Lenaerts). Ibiza: Edicions H. Jenniger, 2011.
Canciones para una música silente. Madrid: Siruela, 2014.
En los prados sembrados de ojos. Madrid: Siruela, 2020.

Poetic Anthologies 

Poesía, 1967-1980. Madrid: Visor Libros, 1982.
Poesía, 1967-1981. Madrid: Visor Libros, 1984.
El río de sombra: Poesía 1967-1990. Madrid: Visor Libros, 1994.
El río de sombra: Treinta años de poesía, 1967-1997. Madrid: Visor Libros, 1999.
La hora interior: Antología poética 1967-2001. Salamanca[?]: Junta de Castilla y León, 2002.
El río de sombra: Treinta y cinco años de poesía, 1967-2002. Madrid: Visor Libros, 2004.
En la luz respirada (critical edition of Sepulcro en Tarquinia, Noche más allá de la noche, and Libro de la mansedumbre). Edited by José E. Martínez). Madrid: Cátedra, 2004.
La luz es nuestra sangre. León: Edilesa, 2006.
Antología. Tenerife: Caja Canarias, 2007.
Nueva ofrenda. Cáceres: Colección Abezetario, 2009.
Obra poética completa. Madrid: Ediciones Siruela, 2011.
Obra poética completa. México DF: Fondo de Cultura Económica/Conaculta, 2011.

Narrative, Essay, and Other Prose 

Viaje a los monasterios de España. Barcelona: Planeta (“Biblioteca Cultural RTV” Collection), 1976. (New edition: León: Edilesa, 2003)
Un año en el sur: para una educación estética. Madrid: Trieste, 1985.
Larga carta a Francesca. Barcelona: Seix Barral, 1986.
Días en Petavonium. Barcelona: Tusquets Editores, 1994.
El crujido de la luz. León: Edilesa, 1999.
Huellas. Valladolid: Castilla Ediciones, 2003.
Cerca de la Montaña Kumgang. Salamanca: Amarú Edciones, 2007.
Leyendo en las piedras. Madrid: Siruela, 2007.
El sentido primero de la palabra poética. Madrid: Siruela, 2008.
"El hombre que odiaba los árboles." In Narraciones de la Escuela. Ed. Isabel Cantón. Barcelona: Editorial Davinci, 2009.

Critical Bibliography on Antonio Colinas’s Works: Books, Articles, Press 

Agustín Fernández, Susana. Inventario de Antonio Colinas. Burgos: Fundación Instituto Castellano y Leonés de la Lengua, 2007.
Alonso Gutiérrez, Luis Miguel. El corazón desmemoriado: Claves poéticas de Antonio Colinas. Salamanca: Diputación Provincial de León, 1990.
Alonso Gutiérrez, Luis Miguel. Antonio Colinas: un clásico del siglo XXI. León: Universidad de León, 2000.
Amusco, Alejandro.  "Inteligencia es belleza."  Rev. of Sepulcro en Tarquinia by Antonio Colinas.  El Ciervo 25, No. 276 (Jan. 1976): 29-30.
Calleja Medel, Gilda Virginia. Antonio Colinas, traductor. León: Universidad de León, 2001.
Carnicero, Luis.  Sobre el contemplar: Antonio Colinas: "Poesía vivida y vida ensoñada". León: Letras de Venatia, 2007.
Fellie, Maria C.  Antonio Colinas: The Re-Writing of ‘Sepulcro en Tarquinia’ in Larga carta a Francesca.  Thesis. University of North Carolina at Chapel Hill, 2009.
de la Fuente, Manuel. "Antonio Colinas, poesía como un bálsamo para tiempos de crisis." ABC 24 February 2011.
Llamazares, Julio.  "La poesía de Antonio Colinas."  El viaje hacia el centro. Madrid: Calambur, 1997. 103-109.
López Castro, Armando. El hilo del aire: Estudios sobre Antonio Colinas. Universidad de León, 2017.
Lucas, Antonio. "A pesar de todo, mi visión del mundo siempre es esperanzada." Interview of Antonio Colinas. El mundo 4 June 2014.
Martín-Estudillo, Luis.  "Europa en el imaginario poético de la España contemporánea (1966-2006): del utopismo ansioso al desencanto crítico.”  Bulletin of Hispanic Studies 87.7 (2010): 801-819.
Martínez Cantón, Clara Isabel. Métrica y poética de Antonio Colinas. Seville: Padilla Libros, 2011.
Martínez Fernández, José Enrique. "Introducción" to En la luz respirada by Antonio Colinas. Madrid: Cátedra, 2004. 13-131.
Moliner, Luis. Respirar: La palabra poética de Antonio Colinas. Madrid: Devenir, 2007.
Nana Tadoun, Guy Merlin.  Antonio Colinas o la escritura como aventura circular: Poesía y transtextualidad desde su trilogía final (1992-2002). Dissertation. U de Salamanca, 2008.
Olivio Jiménez, José. "Prólogo: La poesía de Antonio Colinas." Antonio Colinas: Poesía, 1967-1980. Madrid: Visor, 1982. 7-33.
Pritchett, Kay.  "Antonio Colinas’s Larga carta a Francesca: A Lacanian Approach to Its Formal Construction." Hispania 74.2 (1991): 262-268.
Pritchett, Kay, ed.  "Antonio Colinas."  Four Post-Modern Poets of Spain: A Critical Introduction with Translations of the Poems.  Fayetteville, AR: U of Arkansas P, 1991. 187-223.
Puerto, José Luis. "Antonio Colinas: La poesía como itinerario de purificación." El viaje hacia el centro. Madrid: Calambur, 1997.  41-70.
Riaño, Peio H.  "Tiritas para el paraíso." Público (online newspaper) February 20, 2011. Madrid.
Rodríguez Marcos, Javier. "Antonio Colinas: 'Hemos cometido el error de reducir la poesía a lo intelectual'." El País 12 May 2014.
Rozas, Juan Manuel. "Mi visión del poema 'Sepulcro en Tarquinia'." Ínsula 508 (April 1989): 1-2.
Santiago Bolaños, María Fernanda. "Antonio Colinas: Fuego que emerge de las ruinas del templo." El viaje hacia el centro. Madrid: Calambur, 1997. 117-128.

References

External links
Official Website of Antonio Colinas
Friends of Antonio Colinas, Facebook fan page

1946 births
Living people
Spanish essayists
20th-century Spanish poets
People from La Bañeza
Spanish translators
Spanish journalists
20th-century translators
Spanish male poets
Male essayists
20th-century essayists
20th-century Spanish male writers